Hidden Kingdoms is a British documentary television series that was first broadcast on BBC One on 16 January 2014. The three-part series is narrated by Stephen Fry and shows how animals experience the world from their perspective. Animals shown include a chipmunk, dung beetle, Rufous elephant shrew and treeshrew, and Japanese rhinoceros beetle.

In United States, the series was shown under the alternative title Mini Monsters, which aired at Discovery Channel on 31 May 2014.

Production
Kim Shillinglaw, the BBC's head of commissioning for natural history and science, announced the series on 21 November 2013. The following landscapes were used for the series: savanna, desert, jungle, forest and the metropolis of Rio de Janeiro and Tokyo. The executive producer is Mike Gunton, senior executive of the BBC Natural History Unit, and produced by Mark Brownlow. Hidden Kingdoms is a BBC, Discovery, RTL Group, France Télévisions and CCTV-9 co-production, in association with R.T.I S.p.A.

BBC Worldwide announced pre-sales for Hidden Kingdoms before the 2013 MIPCOM. The series has been licensed to Network Ten (Australia), BBC Knowledge (South Africa), Sveriges Television (Sweden) and RÚV (Iceland). BBC Worldwide also signed a deal with the Korean Broadcasting System.

On-screen warnings of re-enacted elements were shown in Hidden Kingdoms. One of the scenes, featuring a mouse leaping to escape the jaws of a rattlesnake, was created by filming rattlesnakes making strikes at a hot towel placed above a camera, which was then merged with footage of the mouse.

Episode list

Reception
Overnight figures showed that the first episode on 16 January 2014 was watched by 14.4% of the viewing audience for that time, with 3.41 million watching it. The second and third episodes attracted 3.52m (15.5%) and 2.74m (12.4%) respectively.

Some reviewers criticised the show's use of staged scenes and digital editing, stating that the depicted events and locations are "astonishing if true, but frustrating and worthless if merely a digital effect".

Home media
In United Kingdom, a single DVD disc was released on 27 January 2014 by BBC Worldwide.

In United States and Canada, DVD and Blu-ray Disc were released on 8 July 2014. It was distributed by BBC Warner.

In Germany, DVD and Blu-ray Disc were released on 19 December 2014.

In Japan, both DVD and Blu-ray Disc were released on 3 November 2015.

Soundtrack 

The musical score and songs featured in the series were composed and conducted by Ben Foster, with the performed by the BBC Concert Orchestra. The audio cd soundtrack was released on 11 March 2014, while   digital soundtrack was available on 15 January 2016.

References

External links
 
 Hidden Kingdoms at BBC Earth
 
 Mini Monsters at Discovery Channel website
 

2014 British television series debuts
2014 British television series endings
2010s British documentary television series
BBC television documentaries
English-language television shows
Discovery Channel original programming